Diaz Arena is a multi-use stadium in Ostend, Belgium. It is mostly used for football matches and is the home ground of K.V. Oostende. The stadium holds a capacity of 8,432. Before, it was called Albertpark but after the last renovation in 2016 the name was changed in the current name.

Previous names include Albertparkstadion (until 2016) and Versluys Arena (2016-2020).

References

Football venues in Flanders
Sports venues in West Flanders
Sport in Ostend
K.V. Oostende